Michael Desmond Carvill (born 3 April 1988 in Belfast) is a Northern Irish footballer who is currently player-manager of Kilmore Rec.

Career

Early career
Carvill came through the youth ranks at Charlton Athletic but was released by the club in January 2007 without making a first-team appearance.

Wrexham
After his release from Charlton, Carvill joined Welsh club Wrexham and made 14 appearances in the Football League in the 2006–07 and 2007–08 seasons. He was released by Wrexham in May 2008 following the club's relegation to the Football Conference,

Linfield
He joined Irish Premiership club Linfield in August 2008. He signed a new two-year contract in March 2009 with Linfield manager, David Jeffrey, saying of him, "In addition to his enthusiasm and energy he has great technical ability and his skill levels are excellent." He went on to make over 200 appearances for the club in his seven years there.

Crusaders
On Sunday 14 June 2015, Carvill signed for Crusaders after turning down a new contract at Linfield due to lack of first team football. On 7 July 2015, he scored his first goal for the club, a vital away goal in the 1st qualifying round second leg match of the UEFA Champions League against Levadia Tallinn, which saw his side to a 1–1 draw and progression to the next round, having drawn the 1st leg 0–0 at Seaview.

On 30 January 2019, Carvill was loaned out to Dungannon Swifts until the end of the season.

Honours

With Linfield Michael won the IFA Premiership in 2009/10, 2010/11, 2011/12, the Irish Cup in 2010/11, 2011/12 and Co. Antrim Shield in 2013/14.

On Friday 10 July 2020, Michael won the weekly IFA Volunteers Quiz.

References

External links

NIFG profile

1988 births
Living people
Association football forwards
Association footballers from Northern Ireland
Northern Ireland under-21 international footballers
Expatriate footballers in England
Charlton Athletic F.C. players
Wrexham A.F.C. players
English Football League players
NIFL Premiership players
Linfield F.C. players
Crusaders F.C. players
Dungannon Swifts F.C. players